Nguyễn Văn Việt (born 8 December 1989) is a Vietnamese footballer who plays as a defender for V.League 1 club Khánh Hòa.

Career

In 2014, Nguyễn suffered an injury which kept him out for almost 3 years, considering retirement and working as a youth coach for Quang Nam.

For the 2018 season, he signed for Vietnamese top flight side Than Quang Ninh.

References

External links
 Nguyễn Văn Việt at Soccerway

Vietnamese footballers
Living people
1989 births
People from Quảng Nam province
V.League 1 players
Quang Nam FC players
Than Quang Ninh FC players
Hoang Anh Gia Lai FC players
Association football midfielders
Association football defenders